is a JR East railway station located in the city of Kitaakita, Akita Prefecture, Japan.

Lines
Tsurugata Station is served by the Ōu Main Line, and is located 360.3 km from the terminus of the line at Fukushima Station.

Station layout
The station consists of a two opposed side platforms serving two tracks, connected to the station building by a footbridge. The station is unattended.

Platforms

History
Tsurugata Station was opened on January 25, 1952 as a station on the Japan National Railway (JNR), serving the village of Tsurugata, Akita. The station was absorbed into the JR East network upon the privatization of the JNR on April 1, 1987.

Surrounding area
 Tsurugata Elementay School
 Tsurugata Post office

External links

 JR East Station information 

Railway stations in Japan opened in 1952
Railway stations in Akita Prefecture
Ōu Main Line
Noshiro, Akita